Noel Patrick Carroll (12 February 1932 – 4 January 2017) was an Australian rules footballer who played with Fitzroy in the Victorian Football League (VFL).

Notes

External links 		
		

		
		
		
2017 deaths		
1932 births			
Australian rules footballers from Victoria (Australia)		
Fitzroy Football Club players